Shaath or Sha'ath is an Arabic surname. Notable people with the surname include:

 Kamalain Shaath, president of the Islamic University of Gaza, Palestine
 Nabil Shaath (born 1938), Palestinian official

See also
 Shath

Arabic-language surnames